Optic crystals are crystals that can be used to direct a beam of light.

Optic crystals can work as directional guides to the light in photonic devices.

Opticmechanics deals with the grinding, polishing and refining of optic crystals.

Fiber optics